Luis Arroyo Chiques is a Puerto Rican politician and the former mayor of Aguas Buenas. Arroyo is affiliated with the Popular Democratic Party (PPD) and served as mayor from 2005 until 2017. In 2015, he announced that he would not seek reelection.

Luis Arroyo Chiques pleaded guilty in December 2021 for receiving some $270,000 in kickbacks for awarding a contract to the Waste Collection company. A federal district court judge sentenced him to 24 months in prison and two years of probation for conspiracy to commit bribery.

References

Living people
Mayors of places in Puerto Rico
People from Aguas Buenas, Puerto Rico
Popular Democratic Party (Puerto Rico) politicians
Prisoners and detainees of the United States federal government
Puerto Rico politicians convicted of crimes
Year of birth missing (living people)